This is a list of aircraft used by the Royal Hellenic Air Force in World War II.

Fighters 
 PZL P.24
 Gloster Gladiator
 Bloch MB.150

Bombers 

 Bristol Blenheim
 Fairey Battle
 PBY Catalina
 Potez 63

Reconnaissance 
 Avro Anson
 Dornier Do 22

Trainer 

 Avia B-534

See also 

 List of Greek military equipment of World War II

References 

World War II
Aircraft in World War II
Greece